Punjabi Culture Day, also known as Punjab Culture Day or Punjabi New Year, is a day is celebrated on 14 March all over Punjab for the celebration and demonstration of Punjabi culture by Punjabis and Punjabi diaspora.

Celebration
On Punjabi Culture Day, events such as music, dance, bhangra, plays, exhibition, film festival, food and traditional dresses in the form of stalls to introduce cultural values to new generations of Punjabis. In different programmes, tribute are paid to masters in the field of Fine Arts with purpose of promoting love and courtesy on national level. 2020 Punjab Culture Day celebrated Punjab’s customary festivities and traditional colours on March 14 at Lahore's Alhamra Arts Council. Government of Punjab, Pakistan, under Chief Minister Sardar Usman Buzdar approved the celebrations of Punjab Culture Day at national level. Usman Buzdar described that the purpose to observe the Punjab Culture Day is to highlight different facets of Punjab culture and the land of Punjab is filled with hospitality, love and affection.

Gallery

See also
 Punjabi nationalism
 Punjabiyat
 Flag of Punjab, Pakistan
 Punjabi Language Movement
 Punjabi culture
 Punjabi clothing
 Punjabi cuisine

References

External links
Punjab Culture Day event

Punjabi culture
March observances
Saturday observances
Holidays and observances by scheduling (nth weekday of the month)
Punjabi festivals
Annual events in India
Annual events in Pakistan